Camsell may refer to:

 George Camsell (1902–1966), English football player
 Charles Camsell (1876–1958), Canadian geologist and founder of the Royal Canadian Geographical Society
 Camsell Portage Airport (ICAO:CPJ6), an airport in Saskatchewan